Armínio Fraga Neto (born 20 July 1957, in Rio de Janeiro) is a Brazilian economist who was president of the Central Bank of Brazil from 1999 to 2003. From 1993 until his appointment to the Central Bank, he was Managing Director of Soros Fund Management in New York.  Since 2001, he has been a member of the influential Washington-based financial advisory body, the Group of Thirty.

Education
Fraga received his PhD in economics from Princeton University in 1985.

Career
In 2003, he founded the Rio de Janeiro based investment company, Gávea Investimentos.

Fraga has been called the Alan Greenspan of Latin America for his skillful handling of Brazilian monetary policy during his tenure as CBB president.

Fraga worked for both Fernando Henrique Cardoso governments.

In 2009, Fraga served on the High Level Commission on the Modernization of World Bank Group Governance, which – under the leadership of Ernesto Zedillo – conducted an external review of the World Bank Group's governance.

In October 2010, Gávea Investimentos was acquired by Highbridge Capital Management, a subsidiary of J.P. Morgan Asset Management.

Other activities

Corporate boards
 China Investment Corporation, member of the international advisory council (since 2009)

Non-profit organizations
 Council on Foreign Relations, member
 Group of Thirty (G30), member
 Columbia Global Center Rio de Janeiro, member of the advisory board (since 2013)
 Princeton University, member of the board of trustees (2018–2019)

References

External links
Publications at the National Bureau of Economic Research

1957 births
Living people
Presidents of the Central Bank of Brazil
Brazilian economists
Group of Thirty
Pontifical Catholic University of Rio de Janeiro alumni